Robert John Wilson Douglas  (1920–1979) was a Canadian geologist who made contributions in the fields of structure stratigraphy, sedimentation, and petroleum geology.

Education
Douglas was awarded a Manly B. Baker Scholarship and graduated from Queen's University in geology and mineralogy. He obtained a Ph.D. degree in geology from Columbia University.

Career
Douglas worked as a student assistant for the Geological Survey of Canada. He left the Survey for three years to serve as a navigator with the Royal Canadian Air Force.

Douglas has contributed to our understanding of the structure of the Canadian Rocky Mountains and northern Canada. His exposition of the mechanics of bedding plane thrusts, of back-limb thrust faults and folding of the thrusts forms the basis for the later work carried out in these areas.

Douglas also studied the stratigraphy of the Mississippian system in southern Alberta.  These studies provided a detailed description and classification of carbonate rocks and theories on the formation of oil and gas reservoirs.

Personal life 
Douglas and his wife Winnifred lived in Ottawa, Ontario with their three children, Isabel, Robert and Gordon. He died of a heart attack in 1979.

Positions held
1961-1963, member of the Canadian National Committee, 6th World Petroleum Congress
1962-1964, member of the Program Committee of the American Association of Petroleum Geologists
1962-1965, served as Associate Editor of the Geological Society of America
Member of the Geological Survey of Canada Committees on Stable Isotopes and Age Determination, and on Library, Stratigraphic Nomenclature
Committee member on the Geology Advisory Committee of the Alberta Research Council

Honors and awards
Fellow of the Royal Society of Canada
Fellow of the Geological Society of America
Fellow of the Royal Canadian Geographical Society
Member of the American Association of Petroleum Geologists
Member of the Alberta Society of Petroleum Geologists
Member of the National Geographic Society
1965, awarded the Willet G. Miller Medal by the Royal Society of Canada
1976, awarded the Logan Medal by the Geological Association of Canada
1980, the Canadian Society of Petroleum Geologists begins awarding the R. J. W. Douglas Medal

Select publications
Douglas, R. J. W. (1970) Geology and economic minerals of Canada. Geological Survey of Canada.
Price, Raymond A.; Douglas, R. J. W. (1972) Variations in tectonic styles in Canada.  Toronto: Geological Association of Canada.
Douglas, R. J. W. (1981) Callum Creek, Langford Creek, and Gap map-areas, Alberta  Ottawa and Hull, Quebec: Geological Survey of Canada.

External links
 Get Cited- R J W Douglas
 Willet G. Miller Medal Winners
 R.J.W. Douglas Medal

1920 births
1979 deaths
20th-century Canadian geologists
Geological Survey of Canada personnel
Columbia Graduate School of Arts and Sciences alumni
Fellows of the Royal Society of Canada
Queen's University at Kingston alumni
Royal Canadian Air Force personnel of World War II
Fellows of the Geological Society of America
Logan Medal recipients
Canadian expatriates in the United States